ExtendSim (formerly known as Extend) is a simulation program for modeling discrete event, continuous, agent-based, discrete rate, and mixed-mode processes. There are three ExtendSim packages: CP for continuous processes; DE which adds discrete event technology; and Pro which adds discrete rate and reliability block diagramming modules.

History

Model construction
Models are created by dragging blocks from a library into a model worksheet. Blocks are connected together to create the logical flow of the model. Data for the model resides in the parameters of the blocks and in a proprietary database. New blocks can be created by combining existing blocks into a single hierarchical block or by programming a block in ExtendSim's c-based language, ModL. The major libraries in ExtendSim are:

Application areas

Sample applications include resource optimization for food logistics, six sigma process improvement for a hospital emergency department, communication systems,  and manufacturing facility design

See also 
 Discrete event simulation
 Computer model
 Process optimization
 Simulation software
 list of discrete event simulation software

References

External links
 
 ExtendSim blog
 SPICOSA page on ExtendSim
 Rainforest carbon cycling model

Simulation software